The 1999 WGC-American Express Championship was a golf tournament that was contested from 4–7 November 1999 at Valderrama Golf Club in Sotogrande, San Roque, Spain. It was the first WGC-American Express Championship tournament, and the third and final event in the inaugural year of the World Golf Championships.

World number 1, Tiger Woods won the tournament after defeating Miguel Ángel Jiménez in the first extra hole of a playoff. Woods held a four stroke lead going into the 17th hole but hit it into the water on the tough par 5 and ended up scoring a triple bogey that allowed Jiménez to get back in it.

Field
1. Top 50 from the Official World Golf Ranking as of 1 November
Stuart Appleby (2), Stewart Cink, Darren Clarke (3), Glen Day, Steve Elkington, Ernie Els (2,3), Bob Estes (2), Carlos Franco (2), Fred Funk (2), Jim Furyk (2), Sergio García (3), Brent Geiberger (2), Retief Goosen (3), Pádraig Harrington (3), Dudley Hart, Tim Herron (2), Scott Hoch, John Huston (2), Miguel Ángel Jiménez (3), Bernhard Langer (3), Paul Lawrie (3), Tom Lehman (2), Justin Leonard (2), Davis Love III (2), Jeff Maggert (2), Phil Mickelson (2), Colin Montgomerie (3), José María Olazábal, Naomichi Ozaki (6), Craig Parry, Steve Pate (2), Chris Perry (2), Nick Price (2), Loren Roberts (2), Vijay Singh (2), Jeff Sluman (2), Hal Sutton (2), David Toms (2), Bob Tway, Brian Watts, Lee Westwood (3), Tiger Woods (2)
Payne Stewart (2) died in a plane crash on 25 October.
Fred Couples, David Duval (2), Lee Janzen, Mark O'Meara, Masashi Ozaki, Jesper Parnevik, and Steve Stricker did not play.

2. Top 30 on the 1999 PGA Tour money list through the Tour Championship
Notah Begay III, Dennis Paulson, Ted Tryba, Duffy Waldorf, Mike Weir

3. Top 20 on the 1999 European Tour Order of Merit through the Volvo Masters
Thomas Bjørn, Ángel Cabrera, Alex Čejka, Mark James, Robert Karlsson, Bob May, Jarrod Moseley (4), Jarmo Sandelin, Jean van de Velde
John Bickerton did not play.

4. Top 3 on the 1998–99 PGA Tour of Australasia Order of Merit
Rod Pampling, Craig Spence

5. Top 3 on the 1998–99 Southern Africa Tour Order of Merit
Scott Dunlap, David Frost, Richard Kaplan

6. Top 3 on the 1999 Japan Golf Tour Order of Merit through the Philip Morris Championship
Kazuhiko Hosokawa
Shigeki Maruyama did not play.

Round summaries

First round

Second round

Third round

Final round

Playoff

Played on the par-4 18th hole,

References

External links
Full results

1999
1999 WGC
1999 in golf
1999 in Spanish sport
November 1999 sports events in Europe